Fish is an English surname. Notable people with the surname include:

 Albert Fish (1870–1936), American serial killer, rapist, and cannibal
 Albert Fish (politician) (1922–2006), British-Canadian politician
 Amanda Fish, American singer-songwriter and multi-instrumentalist
 Anne Harriet Fish (1890–1964), British cartoonist and illustrator
 Bert Fish (1875–1943), American judge and ambassador
 Bob Fish, American race car owner
 Bobby Fish (born 1976), American professional wrestler
 Calvin Fish (born 1961), British racing driver and commentator
 Curtis Fish (Curt Fish), American curler
 Christopher Fish (born 1993), Swedish professional ice hockey player
 Farnum Fish (1896–1978), American aviator
 Fred Fish (1952–2007), American computer programmer
 Frederick Perry Fish (1855–1930), American lawyer 
 Graeme Fish (born 1997), Canadian speed skater
 Hamilton Fish (disambiguation), multiple people
 Henry Fish (1838–1897), British-New Zealand politician
 Hugh Fish (1923–1999), English chemist and water manager
 Jack Fish (American football) (20th century), American football and baseball coach
 Jack Fish (rugby league) (1878–1940), English rugby league player
 Jacob Fish (born 1956), American academic
 Jasper Fish (18th century), English cricketer
 Jeremy Fish (born 1974), American artist
 John Fish (businessman), American businessman
 John Charles Lounsbury Fish (1870–1962), American civil engineer and educator
 Joseph Fish (Mormon pioneer) (1840–1926), American pioneer
 Leslie Fish, American singer and anarchist
 Mardy Fish (born 1981), American tennis player
 Mark Fish (born 1974), South African footballer
 Mark Fish (composer), American composer
 Mark Fish (writer), American television writer and actor
 Matt Fish (born 1969), American basketball player
 Michael Fish (fashion designer) (born 1940), British fashion designer
 Michael Fish (born 1944), British weather presenter
 Morris Fish (born 1938), Canadian judge
 Nancy Fish (1850–1927), English socialite
 Nate Fish (born 1980), American baseball player and coach
 Nick Fish (1958–2020), American politician and lawyer
 Preserved Fish (1766–1846), American merchant
 Rhiannon Fish (born 1991), Canadian-Australian actress
 Ron Fish, American musician and recording artist
 Samantha Fish (born 1989), American singer-songwriter and guitarist
 Simon Fish (died 1531), English religious reformer
 Stanley Fish (born 1938), American literary theorist
 Stuyvesant Fish (1851–1923), American businessman 

Fictional characters:
 Billy the Fish, a cartoon strip in the British comic Viz
 Oliver Fish, fictional character on the ABC daytime drama One Life to Live
 Detective Phil Fish, character played by Abe Vigoda on the television series Barney Miller and spinoff Fish
 Richard Fish, character from the television series Ally McBeal
 Fish, the surname of the two main characters in the British-Canadian adult animated series Bob and Margaret

See also
 Eric Fish (born 1969), stage name of German singer Erik-Uwe Hecht
 Ginger Fish (born 1965), stage name of American drummer Kenneth Robert Wilson
 Phil Fish (born 1984), pen name of American video game designer Philippe Poisson
Fisch (surname)
Fysh

Surnames from nicknames
English-language surnames